World heavyweight championship may refer to:
 World heavyweight boxing championship (professional)
 World Colored Heavyweight Championship (early twentieth-century)
 World heavyweight championship (professional wrestling)
 AAA Mega Championship
 AWA World Heavyweight Championship
 CMLL World Heavyweight Championship
 ECW World Heavyweight Championship
 GHC Heavyweight Championship
 Impact World Championship
 IWGP Heavyweight Championship
 IWGP World Heavyweight Championship
 NWA Worlds Heavyweight Championship
 NXT Championship
 ROH World Championship
 Triple Crown Heavyweight Championship
 WCW International World Heavyweight Championship
 WCW World Heavyweight Championship
 World Heavyweight Championship (WWE)
 World Zero Heavyweight Championship (Zero1)
 World Heavyweight Wrestling Championship (original version)
 WWE Championship
 WWE Universal Championship
 MLW World Heavyweight Championship
 AEW World Championship
IWW World Heavyweight Championship
 Mixed martial arts:
 Pancrase Heavyweight Championship
 PRIDE Heavyweight Championship
 Shooto Heavyweight Championship
 UFC Heavyweight Championship
 Boxing:
 List of IBF world champions
 List of IBO world champions
 List of The Ring world champions
 List of WBA world champions
 List of WBC world champions
 List of WBO world champions
 List of world heavyweight boxing champions

The following world championships also have weight divisions:
 AIBA World Boxing Championships
 Karate World Championships
 Kickboxing world heavyweight championships
 World Jiu-Jitsu Championship
 World Judo Championships
 World Rowing Championships
 World Taekwondo Championships
 World Wrestling Championships (amateur)

See also 
 Heavy Weight Champ, a heavy-rock band from Perth, Australia
 Heavyweight Champion of the World (song) by Reverend and The Makers